Lalguin is a village in the Thion Department of Gnagna Province in eastern Burkina Faso. The village has a population of 629.

References

Populated places in the Est Region (Burkina Faso)
Gnagna Province